Matthew Yglesias (born May 18, 1981) is an American blogger and journalist who writes about economics and politics. Yglesias has written columns and articles for publications such as The American Prospect, The Atlantic, and Slate. In November 2020, he left his position as an editor and columnist at the news website Vox, which he co-founded in 2014, to publish the Substack newsletter Slow Boring. He is an editor-at-large at Grid, a website of current affairs reporting with a lens on interconnections amongst major challenges. He also cohosts Grid's podcast "Bad Takes" with Executive Editor Laura McGann, the former Politics and Policy Editor at Vox consisting of conversations between McGann and Yglesias on a “bad take” they’ve seen on the internet.

Early life and education
Yglesias's father Rafael Yglesias is a screenwriter and novelist, and he has a brother named Nicolas. His paternal grandparents were novelists Jose Yglesias and Helen Yglesias (née Bassine). His paternal grandfather was of Cuban and Spanish Galician descent, and his three other grandparents were of Eastern European Jewish descent.

Yglesias went to high school at the Dalton School in New York City. He attended Harvard University, where he was editor in chief of The Harvard Independent and graduated in 2003 with a B.A. magna cum laude in philosophy.

Yglesias is married to Kate Crawford. Yglesias and Crawford met in 2008, and have one son together. Crawford now serves as editor for his Slow Boring newsletter.

Career

Early career 
Yglesias started blogging in early 2002, while still in college, focusing mainly on American politics and public policy issues, often approached from an abstract, philosophical perspective.

Yglesias joined the American Prospect as a writing fellow upon his graduation in 2003, subsequently becoming a staff writer. His posts appeared regularly on the magazine's collaborative weblog TAPPED.

From June 2007 until August 2008, he was a staff writer at The Atlantic Monthly, and his blog was hosted on the magazine's website, The Atlantic. In July 2008, he announced that he would leave The Atlantic Monthly for the Center for American Progress where he wrote for its blog, ThinkProgress, because he missed "the sense of collegiality that comes from working with like-minded colleagues on a shared enterprise" and thought he could "help advance their mission." On November 21, 2011, he left ThinkProgress to work as a business and economics correspondent at Slate's Moneybox.

Vox 
In February 2014, he left Slate and joined Vox Media to co-found Vox with Ezra Klein and Melissa Bell. On November 13, 2020, Yglesias announced that he would no longer be writing for Vox.com. Yglesias moved to Substack for editorial independence.

Controversy 
In 2013, Yglesias garnered controversy for his statements about the 2013 Dhaka garment factory collapse, with Yglesias arguing that the lower building standards that partially led to the factory's collapse make "economic sense" in developing countries, later tweeting that "foreign factories should be more dangerous than American factories" and "the current system of letting different countries have different rules is working fine." His comments were widely criticized in The Daily Beast, Time and other outlets, with The Guardian commenting that Yglesias is "confusing a person's human worth with their socio-economic status. That's wrong." Yglesias later clarified some of his comments, but stood by his original position.

Yglesias deleted his past Twitter feed in November 2018, after controversy over tweets which defended the motivation of protesters who gathered outside the house of Tucker Carlson. The tweets also expressed a lack of empathy for Carlson's wife, which caused outrage.

Books 
Yglesias authored the political nonfiction book One Billion Americans: The Case for Thinking Bigger, released on September 15, 2020. It was inspired by Doug Saunders' Maximum Canada. According to an analysis by British digital strategist Rob Blackie, Yglesias was one of the most commonly followed political writers among Biden administration staff on Twitter.

Andrew Sullivan, a fellow blogger, takes nominations on his blog for the Yglesias Award, an honor "for writers, politicians, columnists or pundits who actually criticize their own side, make enemies among political allies, and generally risk something for the sake of saying what they believe."

Political views
In 2011, The Economist noted that Yglesias has been accused of espousing "left-leaning neoliberalism" in his writing. In 2017, Vice listed Yglesias among a group of political writers who were attached with a "neoliberal shill" label in left-wing Twitter communities. Yglesias himself embraced the "neoliberal shill" label in a 2019 podcast.

In 2002, Yglesias was a strong supporter of invading Iraq, Iran and North Korea, calling the countries on his blog "evil" and stating that "we should take them all out", although he was critical of the term "axis of evil". In 2010, he called his attitudes about the war a mistake.

In or before 2010, Yglesias coined the term "pundit's fallacy" to denote "the belief that what a politician needs to do to improve his or her political standing is do what the pundit wants substantively." In 2012, Yglesias stated that he voted for Mitt Romney when he won the office for governor of Massachusetts in 2002.

Works
 Heads in the Sand: How the Republicans Screw Up Foreign Policy and Foreign Policy Screws Up the Democrats, Wiley, April 2008, .
 "Long Philosophical Rant about Spider-Man 2", Ultimate blogs: masterworks from the wild Web, Editor Sarah Boxer, Random House, Inc., 2008, 
 "The Media", The 12-Step Bush Recovery Program, Gene Stone, Carl Pritzkat, Tony Travostino, Random House, Inc., 2008, 
 The Rent Is Too Damn High, Simon and Schuster, March 2012, ASIN B0078XGJXO
 One Billion Americans: The Case for Thinking Bigger, Portfolio Penguin, September 2020, .

References

External links

slowboring - Matthew Yglesias blog

1981 births
21st-century American Jews
21st-century American male writers
21st-century American non-fiction writers
American bloggers
American male bloggers
American people of Spanish descent
American political writers
American writers of Cuban descent
Center for American Progress people
Dalton School alumni
Harvard College alumni
Jewish American writers
Living people
Vox (website) people
Place of birth missing (living people)